The Ralph John Ramer House, is located near the downtown area of Anderson, South Carolina. The house was built in 1930 and is historically significant as an excellent example of an early-20th century Tudor Revival residence. Ramer was a leading Anderson businessman, government official, military officer and civic leader. Much of the noteworthy architectural detail of this house can be viewed from the public road that fronts the grounds. The house was listed in the National Register on February 10, 1992.

References

Houses on the National Register of Historic Places in South Carolina
Tudor Revival architecture in South Carolina
Houses completed in 1930
Houses in Anderson County, South Carolina
National Register of Historic Places in Anderson County, South Carolina